Panjal  (IAST: pāññāḷ) is a village near Chelakkara, Thrissur district in the state of Kerala, India.
The village is known for the Athirathram yāgam, held in 1975 and 2011. The yāgam is one of the oldest rituals of mankind in existence, and the ritual has only been maintained by small communities in India.

Demographics
Panjal is Famous for the Athirathram which was held in the year 1975. Panjal is situated near the bank of Nila (Bharathapuzha). As of 2001 India census Panjal had a population of 5893 with 2803 males and 3090 females.
Panjal village is full of greenery and scenery. Many ancient Kerala-style temples such as Lakshmi Narayana temple, Ayyappan Kavu, Kaattil Kavu Siva temple, Mathur Vettekkaran temple, Nellikkattil Ganapathy temple, Machil Bhagavathy, Mullakkal Bhagavathy, Thekkummuri Subramanian Kovil, Padinjattumuri Subramanian Kovil, Mariamman Kovil, Palunkil temple, etc. are in this village.

Festivals
Ayyappan Kavu Uthram Vela and Padinjattumuri Subramanyan Kovil Thypooyam are the famous festivals in this village, 5 to 15 elephants will participate in this vela.. after that vedikettu (fire works) will also happen. For thypooyam there will be many Kaavadis and naadaswarams of famous Kerala teams with traditional chenda melam at the kovil premises. At a time there was nobody to look after the kovil. Now a group of dynamic youths are looking after the kovil with the help of villagers. Now the kovil have a kalyanamandapam and an Annadaana mandapam, and many more projects are under process. Maha Kiratha Rudra Yajnam at Thottathil mana Vettekkaran temple is also famous, now last eight years this yajnam is going on in the months of April or May. It was normally ten days program including Bhagavatha Sapthaha Yajnam, shatha chandikayagam, major team Panjavadyam and Thayambaka, and very important and powerful program is Kalampaattu and 12000 coconut-breaking (pantheerayiram). Vettekkaran Seva Samithi does this program under the chief instruction by Thottathil mana Kuttan Namboothiri, the disciple of Thanthri ThanthraRathnam Azhakathu Shasthru Sharman Namboothirippad, the president of thanthra Vidya peetham-Aluva. Now Sivakiratham Global Trust is coordinating an Athirathram on 2013, as a celebration of the tenth anniversary of Maha Kiratha rudra Yajnam.

Expatriates
From this village many people are working in various cities of India such Salem, Coimbatore, Madurai, Bangalore, Chennai, Mumbai, Calcutta, Delhi and many people are working in Gulf countries and European countries. People of this village are highly educated and rich in culture. The famous Vazhelikkavu Bhagavathy temple is situated in this village and the ayyappan kavu temple and kaattil kave temple premises has been a part of many of the famous Malayalam films such as Kuttiedathy, Oridathu, Devasuram, Balettan, and Pasupathi.

Film shooting
Because of the beauty of this village many cinema shootings has been happening in this village (Tamil film Muthu and many Malayalam films including Godha)

The world-famous Kerala Kalamandalam is at Cheruthuruthy which is near this village. The main films are Balettan, Akasthile Paravakal, Madampi, Malarvadi Arts Club, and Ee Puzhayum Kadannu,peruvannapurathe visheshangalNotable persons
Malayalam playwright Thuppettan was born in Panjal. Playback singer Srikumar who sang the song "Anuraga Vilochananayi" in the film Neelathamara'' also belongs to this village.

Schools
This village has one higher secondary school "Government Higher Secondary School, Panjal", two UP schools 1, "GUPS Painkulam" 2, gups Killimangalam and one Engineering college, "Jyothi Engineering College".

References

Villages in Thrissur district